The Plymouth De Luxe and Special De Luxe were full-sized automobiles which were produced by American manufacturer Plymouth during the 1933-42 and 1946-50 model years. 

The Plymouth Deluxe Model PD appeared in 1933, shortly after the Plymouth Six Model PC which was the company's first six-cylinder automobile but offered a  wheelbase versus 112 for the De Luxe. 

It was an upscale alternative to the Plymouth Six (1933-1934), Business Six (1935-1938) and Roadking (1938-1940).  In 1941, the Roadking name was dropped for the low trim Plymouths, which were referred as P11 and not renewed in 1942, making the De Luxe, the entry level. 

Between 1941 and 1950, the De Luxe was offered in two trim levels, the De Luxe and the top-of-the-line Special De Luxe. The engine in 1946 was a   Plymouth Straight Six. In 1949 this engine was upgraded to produce .

References

 Gunnell, John (Editor): Standard Catalog of American Cars 1946-1975, Krause Publications Inc., Iola (2002), 
Byrne, Jared (writer): How to restore historical cars 1940-1950

External links

Allpar:Plymouth cars of 1949 to 1952
Plymouth sales brochures 1936 to 1986, www.oldcarbrochures.com

De Luxe
Rear-wheel-drive vehicles
Full-size vehicles
1950s cars
Cars introduced in 1946